Numminen is a Finnish surname. Notable people with the surname include:

Kalevi Numminen (born 1940), professional Finnish ice hockey player
M. A. Numminen (born 1940), Finnish artist
Teppo Numminen (born 1968), professional Finnish ice hockey player

Finnish-language surnames